Queenstown is the name of several human settlements around the world, nearly all in countries that are part of the Commonwealth of Nations.

Queenstown may refer to:

Places currently named Queenstown

Queenstown, Alberta, a hamlet in Canada
Queenstown, Blackpool, an area of Blackpool, Lancashire, England
Queenstown, Guyana, in Guyana
Queenstown, Maryland, a town in the United States
Queenstown, New Zealand, a resort town in Otago, New Zealand
Queenstown, Singapore, a residential town in Singapore
Queenstown, South Africa, a town in South Africa
Queenstown, South Australia, a suburb of Adelaide, Australia
Queenstown, Tasmania, a town in Tasmania, Australia
Queenstown, Virginia, United States
Queenstown, Wisconsin, an unincorporated community in the United States

Places formerly named Queenstown
Cobh, a town in Ireland
Port Clements, British Columbia, Canada
Queenston, Ontario, Canada
St Andrews, Victoria, Australia
Victoria, Hong Kong

See also
Queensborough (disambiguation)
Queenston (disambiguation)
Queensland, an Australian state